Nadi Vahate (English: River Flows) or Nadi Vaahate is a 2017 Indian Marathi-language feature film written and directed by Sandeep Sawant. It was scheduled to be theatrically released on 22 September 2027.

Plot
Should I save my river and how? These are the questions that drive this entire film. It focuses on the relationship between a river and people along its banks with respect to their life, needs, desires and greed.
Saving small rivers flowing through different villages is the need of the hour. It is the only way to sustainable development. Smaller, indigenous businesses and efforts along the river banks are very important. These efforts will lead villages to become self dependent and also balance of development will be achieved.
This film is a journey of people's constructive resistance to save their river and to become self sufficient.

Credits 
 Production Designer (Art & Costumes): Neeraja Patwardhan 
 Sync sound & Sound Design: Suhas Rane 
 Sound design & Sound mixing: Mandar Kamalapurkar 
 Editor: Neeraj Voralia 
 Background Music: Tushar Kamat & Jairaj Joshi

Cast
 Vasant Josalkar as Guruj
 Poonam Shetgaonkar as Anagha
 Asha Shelar as Anagha's Mother
 Hridaynath Jadhav as Bhau
 Jayant Gadekar as Appa Naik
 Abhishekh Aanand as Akash
 Shivkumar Subramaniam as Project Head
 Gajanan Zarmekar as Prakash
 Mahadev Sawant as Tukaram
 Vishnupad Barve as Mangesh
 Bhushan Vikas as Mr. Kachre

Production

Development 
After the appreciated 2004 Marathi film Shwaas, which won the National Film Award for Best Feature Film and was also India's official submission for the Academy Awards for Best Foreign Language Film, Sawant produced Nadi Vahate after four years of research.

Filming 
The film has been shot in Kudal, Dodamarg and Sawantwadi talukas of Sindhudurga along the foothills of the Western Ghats and Valpoi, Sakhali and Sattari in North Goa.

Reception

Critical reception 
Emma Colvan wrote "The film is an apt illustration of the relations of power and inequality that often coalescence around water and other resources, as well as the tensions between urban money and rural life. Notably, the film brings together current concerns over the impacts of land acquisition on local communities, and the cultural and ecological impacts wrought by land use change." Ganesh Matkari of Pune Mirror wrote "The film avoids spoon-feeding and the plot unfolds from the perspective of the operatives, as each new piece of information is revealed. This strategy works very well in the pre-interlude episodes and we easily sympathize with the protagonists' plight.  The second half relies more on discussion about the problem and possible solutions. Nadi Vahate doesn't just try to use stereotypical characters, relationships or situations to make it audience-friendly but instead, it takes issues very seriously and avoids a simplistic approach or easy solutions. The ending of the film is a bit ambiguous and would not be conventionally satisfying. But that is exactly the point. Keeping things in perspective requires avoiding a good or dramatically tragic climax. Sandeep Sawant, who has also written the film and composed it masterfully, has to be credited for maintaining the tone of the film."

Accolades 
This film has won Special Jury award for the director Sandeep Sawant at 2017 Pune International Film Festival,  and Special Jury Award at 2017 Zee Chitragaurav. Nadi Vahate also won "Screen National Award" at Goa Marathi Film festival.

References

Further reading

External links
 

2010s Marathi-language films